Christian Lasegue is an international recording and performing artist. He was formerly a member of the critically acclaimed music group Jag Panzer until his departure in 2011. Currently, he is a Psychologist/Professor.

History 
Christian Lasegue joined Jag Panzer prior to recording Chain of Command; following the release of that album, he left the band in order to pursue other musical and educational goals. Rejoining the band in 2008, he recorded the critically acclaimed album The Scourge of the Light in 2010, which placed at No. 117 on the Billboard New Artist Chart, making the album Jag Panzer's most successful to date. . Lasegue left Jag Panzer in 2011.

Christian has been featured on several other albums, including "Shredding Across the World, Volume Three", Leviathan's "Beholden to Nothing, Braver Since Then", and Sylencer's "A Lethal Dose of Truth" (in which he recorded the track "Rise and Die", alongside Dream Theater's Jordan Rudess). In addition to the aforementioned recording history, Christian Lasegue has been featured in numerous trade magazines, including Guitar Player, as well as various radio and blog interviews/features. 

Lasegue has performed/recorded with classic rock artists such as Kenny Loggins, members of Steppenwolf, Frank Zappa, Loggins and Messina, Spencer Davis, Chris Hillman, Herman's Hermits, Warren Zevon, Axe, and Badfinger.

Christian Lasegue is a former student of legendary Rock guitarist Jason Becker, as well as Jazz guitarist Jerry Hahn. Additionally, he studied Jazz piano with Bill Alexander and Classical guitar with Ricardo Iznaola.

References

External links 
Jag Panzer's official website

American heavy metal guitarists
Seven-string guitarists
American male guitarists
Living people
Year of birth missing (living people)